Blair Flats, also known as the Blair Arcade Building, is a Victorian residential building designed by Hermann Kretz and William H. Thomas in 1887, located in Saint Paul, Minnesota, United States. The building is located on the intersection of Western and Selby Avenues. It is also a contributing property to the Historic Hill District.  Construction materials are sandstone and brick.  The building has been used as apartments, hotel, and condominiums.

The lower level currently holds SubText: a Bookstore, a community-oriented independent bookstore owned by veteran bookseller Sue Zumberge. The space formerly housed Common Goods Books, an independent bookstore owned by noted Minnesotan Garrison Keillor.

References

External links

Blair Flats (Angus Hotel) 1911
Blair Flats (Angus Hotel) at the Minnesota Historical Society

Individually listed contributing properties to historic districts on the National Register in Minnesota
National Register of Historic Places in Saint Paul, Minnesota
Residential buildings completed in 1887
Residential buildings on the National Register of Historic Places in Minnesota
Victorian architecture in Minnesota
Residential buildings in Saint Paul, Minnesota